Okayama is the capital city of Okayama Prefecture in the Chūgoku region of Japan.

Okayama may also refer to:

Locations
Okayama Castle, a castle in Okayama, Okayama Prefecture, Japan
Okayama Domain, a Japanese feudal domain of the Edo period, located in modern-day Okayama Prefecture
Okayama Prefecture, a prefecture in Japan
2084 Okayama, a Main-belt Asteroid discovered in 1935 by S. Arend

People
 Amane Okayama (岡山 天音, Okayama Amane, born 1994), Japanese actor
Kazunari Okayama (born 1978), a Japanese soccer football player
Saeko Okayama (岡山 沙英子, Okayama Saeko, born 1982), Japanese long jumper
Tomoki Okayama (岡山 智樹, Okayama Tomoki, born 1996), Japanese actor

Education
Okayama Gakuin University, a private university in Kurashiki, Okayama Prefecture, Japan
Okayama Prefectural University, a public university in Sōja, Okayama Prefecture, Japan
Okayama Shoka University, a private university in Okayama, Okayama Prefecture, Japan
Okayama University, a national university located in Okayama, Okayama Prefecture, Japan
Okayama University of Science, a private university in Okayama, Okayama Prefecture, Japan
Okayama College, a private junior college in Kurashiki, Okayama, Japan

Sports
Fagiano Okayama F.C., a football (soccer) club from Okayama, Okayama Prefecture, Japan
Okayama General and Cultural Gymnasium, an indoor sporting arena located in Okayama, Okayama Prefecture, Japan
Okayama International Circuit, a private motorsport race track in Mimasaka, Okayama Prefecture, Japan
Okayama Seagulls, a women's volleyball team based in Okayama, Okayama Prefecture, Japan

Transportation
Okayama Airport, an airport in Okayama Prefecture, Japan
Okayama Electric Tramway, a private transportation company operating tram and bus lines in Okayama, Okayama Prefecture, Japan 
Okayama Expressway, a national highway in Okayama Prefecture, Japan
Okayama Freight Terminal, a JR Freight rail station 
Okayama Station, a JR West railway station located in Okayama, Okayama Prefecture, Japan
Ōokayama Station, a railway station on the Ōimachi and Meguro Lines in Ōta, Tokyo, Japan

Other
Okayama (dance), a Japanese Muromachi-period kōwakamai
Okayama at-large district, a constituency
Okayama Broadcasting, a TV station broadcasting in Okayama and Kagawa Prefectures, Japan
Okayama Planet Search Program, a project started in 2001 to spectroscopically search for planetary systems around stars

See also

 
 Oka (disambiguation)
 Yama (disambiguation)

Japanese-language surnames